Borospherene (B40) is a cluster molecule containing 40 boron atoms. It is similar to buckminsterfullerene, the "spherical" carbon structure, but with a different symmetry. The discovery of borospherene was announced in July 2014, and is described in the journal Nature Chemistry. Borospherene is similar to other cluster molecules, including buckminsterfullerene (C60), stannaspherene, and plumbaspherene. The molecule includes unusual heptagonal faces.

Structure 
Borospherene has a unique axis of symmetry (a 180° rotation), so it is not really "spherical" like buckminsterfullerene (which has icosahedral symmetry). Its symmetry group is D2d (antiprismatic symmetry, like a baseball). It includes 48 boron triangles between four seven-sided rings and two six-membered rings. There are four sets of eight equivalent boron atoms, and two sets of four equivalent atoms. Each boron atom binds to four or five other boron atoms (see illustration in article from Brown University).

Lai-Sheng Wang, professor of chemistry at Brown University, modeled possible B40 structures on computer. Two forms were predicted – a sheet-like structure and a closed cage. Photoelectron spectroscopy revealed that the substance formed in the laboratory was this cage. The structure of the cage is not perfectly uniform – "Several atoms stick out a bit from the others, making the surface of borospherene somewhat less smooth than a buckyball" according to Wang.

See also
Allotropes of boron
Borophene

References

External links

Allotropes of boron
Fullerenes